The 2017 Black-Eyed Susan Stakes was the 93rd running of the Black-Eyed Susan Stakes. The race took place on May 19, 2016, and was televised in the United States on the NBC Sports Network. Ridden by jockey Nik Juarez, Actress won the race by a head over runner-up Lights of Medina. Approximate post time on the Friday evening before the Preakness Stakes was 4:50 p.m. Eastern Time. The Maryland Jockey Club supplied a purse of $300,000 for the 93rd running. The race was run over a fast track in a final time of 1:51.87.  The Maryland Jockey Club reported a Black-Eyed Susan Stakes Day record attendance of 50,339. The attendance at Pimlico Race Course that day was a record crowd for Black-Eyed Susan Stakes Day and the sixth largest for a thoroughbred race in North America in 2017.

Payout 

The 93rd Black-Eyed Susan Stakes Payout Schedule

$2 Exacta:  (10–5) paid   $ 240.20

$2 Trifecta:  (10–5–6) paid   $ 3,898.60

$1 Superfecta:  (10–5–6-8) paid   $ 16,579.20

The full chart 

 Winning Breeder: Gary & Mary West Stables, Inc.; (KY)  
 Final Time: 1:51.87
 Track Condition: Fast
 Total Attendance: Record of 50,339

See also 
 2017 Preakness Stakes
 Black-Eyed Susan Stakes Stakes "top three finishers" and # of  starters

References

External links 
 Official Black-Eyed Susan Stakes website
 Official Preakness website

2017 in horse racing
Horse races in Maryland
2017 in American sports
Black-Eyed Susan Stakes
2017 in sports in Maryland
May 2017 sports events in the United States